This is a list of members of the Senate of Nigeria from Rivers State, Nigeria.

See also
Nigerian National Assembly delegation from Rivers State
Elections in Rivers State

References

Members of the Senate (Nigeria) from Rivers State
Lists of Members of the Senate (Nigeria)
Members of the Senate
Members of the Senate